24 km is a rural locality (a settlement) in Korfovskoye Urban Settlement of Khabarovsky District, Russia. The population was 81 as of 2012. There are 2 streets.

Geography 
24 km is located 27 km south of Khabarovsk (the district's administrative centre) by road. Korfovsky is the nearest rural locality.

References 

Rural localities in Khabarovsk Krai